Sangeeta is an Indian actress who has predominantly worked in Telugu films, alongside Tamil, Kannada and Malayalam films. She has appeared with leading actors like Sivaji Ganesan, Rajinikanth, Kamal Haasan and Chiranjeevi. In the late 1990s she started appearing as a character artist. She has appeared in over 500 films in various languages.

She is the recipient of Rashtrapati award for her performance in Mutyala Muggu.

Early life 
Sangeeta hails from Warangal. She debuted in 1975 with the Mutyala Muggu, though she shot for Teerpu before.

Sangeeta is married to Sundar Rajan.

Notable filmography
This list is incomplete; you can help by expanding it.

Telugu

Mutyala Muggu (1975) - Debut in Telugu
Teerpu (1975)
Chilakamma Cheppindi (1977)
Manushulu Chesina Dongalu (1977)
Sri Rama Pattabhishekam (1978) as Goddess Sita
Rathi Manmadha (1979)
Tayaramma Bangarayya (1979) as Vani
 Maha Shakti (1979) as Mahadevi
Nakili Manishi (1980)
Bhale Krishnudu (1980)
Prema Natakam (1981)
Intlo Ramayya Veedhilo Krishnayya (1982)
Pelleedu Pillalu (1982) as Durga
 Griha Pravesham (1982)
Khaidi (1983) as Sooryam's Elder Sister
Mahanagaramlo Mayagadu (1984)
Srivariki Premalekha (1984) as Kamakshi
Punnami Rathri (1985)
Karu Diddina Kapuram (1986)
 Lawyer Suhasini (1987)
Kashmora (1986)
Jagadeka Veerudu Atiloka Sundari (1990) as teacher
Sathruvu (1991)
 Allari Alludu (1993)
 Pelli Koduku (1994)
Aame (1994) as Ooha's Mother
Bhairava Dweepam (1994) as Padma's Mother
Hello Brother (1994) as Geetha
Raja Simham (1995)
Sarada Bullodu (1996)
Manasichi Choodu (1998)
Tholi Prema (1998) as Hero's Mother
Badri (2000)
Chiru Navvutho (2000)
 Prema Sandadi (2001)
 Snehamante Idera (2001)
Idiot (2002)
Seema Simham (2002)
Aadi (2002)
Simhadri (2003)
Shivamani (2003)
Varsham (2004)
Sundarakanda (2008)
Ek Niranjan (2009)
Sevakudu (2013)
Sita (2019)
Tolu Bommalata (2019)
Pressure Cooker (2020)

Tamil

Anna Nee En Deivam (unreleased) - Debut in Tamil
Aadu Puli Attam (1977)
Dheepam (1977)
Thanikudithanam (1977)
Panchamirdham (1978)
Punniya Boomi (1978)
Aadu Pambe (1979)
Aarilirunthu Arubathu Varai (1979)
Mahalakshmi (1979)
Pancha Boodham (1979)
Nenjukku Needhi (1979)
Bombay Mail 109 (1980)
Muzhu Nilavu (1980)
Kadavulin Theerpu (1981)
Mangala Lakshmi (1981)
Villiyanur Matha (1983)
Ambigai Neril Vanthaal (1984) as Radha's Sister
Uravai Kaatha Kili (1984)
Oh Maane Maane (1984)
Un Kannil Neer Vazhindal (1985)
Oomai Vizhigal (1986)
Uyire Unakkaga (1986) as Asha Devi
Uthami (1986)
Per Sollum Pillai (1987)
Anbulla Appa (1987)
Avasara Police 100 (1990) as Seetha
Aarathi Edungadi (1990)
Vaigasi Poranthachu (1990) as Ranjitha's Mother
Nanbargal (1990) as Priya's Mother
Vazhndhu Kattuvom (1990) Bramachari (1992)Unnai Vaazhthi Paadugiren (1992) as Priya's MotherInnisai Mazhai (1992) as Michael's MotherBharathan (1992) as JanakiUnakkaga Piranthen (1992)David Uncle (1992) as Selvi's MotherThevar Veetu Ponnu (1992) as Sangari and Savithri MotherNeenga Nalla Irukkanum (1992)Chinna Pasanga Naanga (1992)Uzhaippali (1993)Prathap (1993)Aathma (1993) as Saravanan's MotherCaptain (1994)En Rajangam (1994) as Suresh's MotherJallikattu Kaalai (1994) as Radha's MotherMettupatti Mirasu (1994) as ValliammaiPudhusa Pootha Rosa (1994)Manathile Oru Paattu (1995)Raja Pandi (1995)Thirumoorthy (1995) as LakshmiChinna Mani (1995)Ragasiya Police (1995) as Suriya's MotherMarumagan (1995)Murai Maman (1995) as SarathaVetri Vinayagar (1996) as AsirikaiThaali Pudhusu (1997) as LakshmiPeriya Thambi (1997) as SivagamiGolmaal (1998) as Aishwarya's MotherPriyamaanavale (2000) as Priya's MotherPirivom Santhippom (2008) as Deivanai

KannadaNyaya Ellide (1982) - Debut in KannadaPavitra Prema (1984)Khaidhi (1984)Shiva Mecchida Kannappa (1988)Gajapathi Garvabhanga (1989)Mahabharatha (1997)Sugreeva (2010)Vishnuvardhana (2011)Krishnan Marriage Story (2011)Kiladi Kitty (2012)Dandupalya 2 (2016)

MalayalamSamasya (1976) - Debut in MalayalamUyirthezhunnelppu (1985)Kadinjool Kalyanam (1991) as Pothuval's WifeNeelagiri (film) (1991) as Ani's MotherUncle Bun (1991) as Saramma James

Television series
 Vasantham'' (SUN TV) - Tamil (2010-2011) - Sakthi

References

External links
 
 Sangeethe Interview

Year of birth missing (living people)
Actresses in Tamil cinema
Actresses in Telugu cinema
Indian film actresses
Living people
Actresses in Malayalam cinema
20th-century Indian actresses
21st-century Indian actresses
Indian television actresses
Actresses in Tamil television
Actresses in Kannada cinema
Actresses from Telangana